The  is a mid-Heian period monogatari in one volume. It is believed to have completed in the Ōwa or Kōhō eras, or 961-968. It tells the story of how the Lesser Captain of the Right Fujiwara no Takamitsu moved to Tōnomine in August 961, and centers around the waka exchanged between Takamitsu, his wife (the daughter of Fujiwara no Atsutoshi) and his sister Ainomiya.

See also 
Heian literature

Japanese novels
Late Old Japanese texts
Monogatari
Works of unknown authorship
10th-century Japanese books